The Avionics Services Caçador is a Brazilian multi-role MALE unmanned aerial vehicle (UAV) developed from the Israeli IAI Heron with transfer of technology.

The Caçador was developed by Avionics Services with support from a local IAI subsidiary that supplied know-how and technology. IAI Brasil acquired forty percent of the company, keeping Avionics Services under the benefit of the national law on "Strategic Defense Company" that requires two thirds of non-foreign ownership.

Specifications

References

Unmanned aerial vehicles of Brazil
Unmanned military aircraft of Brazil
2010s Brazilian military reconnaissance aircraft
2010s Brazilian military aircraft
Medium-altitude long-endurance unmanned aerial vehicles